Andrés Mata is a municipality of Sucre, Venezuela. The capital is San José de Aerocuar.

Municipalities of Sucre (state)